The Caucasus field mouse (Apodemus hyrcanicus)  is a species of rodent in the family Muridae.

It is found in Talysh region in SE Azerbaijan, northern Iran and possibly SW Turkmenistan.

References

Rats of Asia
Mammals of the Middle East
Mammals of Azerbaijan
Fauna of Iran
Apodemus
Mammals described in 1992
Taxonomy articles created by Polbot